The Federal Security Service of the Russian Federation (FSB) (RF) is the principal security forces of Russia and the main successor agency to the Soviet Union's KGB; its immediate predecessor was the Federal Counterintelligence Service (FSK) which was reorganized into the FSB in 1995. The three major structural successor components of the former KGB that remain administratively independent of the FSB are the Foreign Intelligence Service (SVR), the Federal Protective Service (FSO), and the Main Directorate of Special Programs of the President of the Russian Federation (GUSP).

The primary responsibilities are within the country and include counter-intelligence, internal and border security, counter-terrorism, and surveillance as well as investigating some other types of serious crimes and federal law violations. It is headquartered in Lubyanka Square, Moscow's center, in the main building of the former KGB. The director of the FSB is appointed by and directly answerable to the president of Russia.

In 2003, the FSB's responsibilities were expanded by incorporating the Border Guard Service and a major part of the Federal Agency of Government Communication and Information (FAPSI); this would include intelligence activities in countries that were once members of the Soviet Union, work formerly done by the KGB's Fifth Service. The SVR had in 1992 signed an agreement not to spy on those countries; the FSB had made no such commitment.

History

Initial recognition of the KGB

The Federal Security Service is one of the successor organizations of the Soviet Committee of State Security (KGB). Following the attempted coup of 1991—in which some KGB units as well as the KGB head Vladimir Kryuchkov played a major part—the KGB was dismantled and ceased to exist from November 1991. In December 1991, two government agencies answerable to the Russian president were created by President Yeltsin's decrees on the basis of the relevant main directorates of the defunct KGB: Foreign Intelligence Service (Russia) (SVR, the former First Main Directorate) and the Federal Agency of Government Communications and Information (FAPSI, merging the functions of the former 8th Main Directorate and 16th Main Directorate of the KGB). In January 1992, another new institution, the Ministry of Security took over domestic and border security responsibilities. Following the 1993 constitutional crisis, the Ministry of Security was reorganized on 21 December 1993 into the Federal Counter-Intelligence Service (FSK). The FSK was headed by Sergei Stepashin. Before the start of the main military activities of the First Chechen War the FSK was responsible for the covert operations against the separatists led by Dzhokhar Dudayev.

Creation of the FSB
In 1995, the FSK was renamed and reorganized into the Federal Security Service (FSB) by the Federal Law "On the Federal Security Service" (the title of the law as amended in June 2003) signed by the president on 3 April 1995. The FSB reforms were rounded out by decree No. 633, signed by Boris Yeltsin on 23 June 1995. The decree made the tasks of the FSB more specific, giving the FSB substantial rights to conduct cryptographic work, and described the powers of the FSB director. The number of deputy directors was increased to eight: two first deputies, five deputies responsible for departments and directorates and one deputy director heading the Moscow City and Moscow regional directorate. Yeltsin appointed Colonel-General Mikhail Ivanovich Barsukov as the new director of the FSB. In 1998, Yeltsin appointed Vladimir Putin, a KGB veteran who would later succeed Yeltsin as federal president, as director of the FSB. Putin was reluctant to take over the directorship, but once appointed conducted a thorough reorganization, which included the dismissal of most of the FSB's top personnel. Putin appointed Nikolai Patrushev as the head of FSB in 1999.

Role in the Second Chechen War
After the main military offensive of the Second Chechen War ended and the separatists changed tactics to guerilla warfare, overall command of the federal forces in Chechnya was transferred from the military to the FSB in January 2001. While the army lacked technical means of tracking the guerrilla groups, the FSB suffered from insufficient human intelligence due to its inability to build networks of agents and informants. In the autumn of 2002, the separatists launched a massive campaign of terrorism against the Russian civilians, including the Dubrovka theatre attack. The inability of the federal forces to conduct efficient counter-terrorist operations led to the government to transfer the responsibility of "maintaining order" in Chechnya from the FSB to the Ministry of Internal Affairs (MVD) in July 2003.

Putin reforms

After becoming president, Vladimir Putin launched a major reorganization of the FSB. First, the FSB was placed under direct control of the President by a decree issued on 17 May 2000. The internal structure of the agency was reformed by a decree signed on 17 June 2000. In the resulting structure, the FSB was to have a director, a first deputy director and nine other deputy directors, including one possible state secretary and the chiefs of six departments: Economic Security Department, Counterintelligence Department, Organizational and Personnel Service, Department of activity provision, Department for Analysis, Forecasting and Strategic Planning, Department for Protection of the Constitutional System and the Fight against Terrorism.

In 2003, the agency's responsibilities were considerably widened. The Border Guard Service of Russia, with its staff of 210,000, was integrated to the FSB via a decree was signed on 11 March 2003. The merger was completed by 1 July 2003. In addition, The Federal Agency of Government Communication and Information (FAPSI) was abolished, and the FSB was granted a major part of its functions, while other parts went to the Ministry of Defense. Among the reasons for this strengthening of the FSB were the enhanced need for security after increased terror attacks against Russian civilians starting with the Moscow theater hostage crisis; the need to end the permanent infighting between the FSB, FAPSI and the Border Guards due to their overlapping functions; and the need for more efficient response to migration, drug trafficking and illegal arms trading. It has also been pointed out that the FSB was the only power base of the new president, and the restructuring therefore strengthened Putin's position (see Political groups under Vladimir Putin's presidency).

On 28 June 2004 in a speech to high-ranking FSB officers, Putin emphasized three major tasks of the agency: neutralizing foreign espionage, safeguarding economic and financial security of the country and combating organized crime. In September 2006, the FSB was shaken up by a major reshuffle, which, combined with some earlier reassignments (most remarkably, those of FSB Deputy Directors Yury Zaostrovtsev and Vladimir Anisimov in 2004 and 2005, respectively), were widely believed to be linked to the Three Whales Corruption Scandal that had slowly unfolded since 2000. Some analysts considered it to be an attempt to undermine FSB Director Nikolay Patrushev's influence, as it was Patrushev's team from the Karelian KGB Directorate of the late 1980s – early 1990s that had suffered most and he had been on vacations during the event.

By 2008, the agency had one Director, two First Deputy Directors and 5 Deputy Directors. It had the following 9 divisions:
Counter-Espionage
Service for Defense of Constitutional Order and Fight against Terrorism
Border Service
Economic Security Service
Current Information and International Links
Organizational and Personnel Service
Monitoring Department
Scientific and Technical Service
Organizational Security Service

Anti-terrorist operations

Starting from the Moscow theater hostage crisis in 2002, Russia was faced with increased levels of terrorism. During the Moscow theater siege and the Beslan school siege, FSB's Spetsnaz units Alpha Group and Vympel played a key role in the hostage rescue operations. However, their performance was criticised due to the high number of hostage casualties. In 2006, the FSB successfully killed Shamil Basayev, the person behind the Beslan tragedy and several other high-profile terrorist acts. According to the FSB, the operation was planned over six months and made possible due to the FSB's increased activities in foreign countries that were supplying arms to the terrorists. Basayev was tracked via the surveillance of this arms trafficking. Basayev and other militants were preparing to carry out a terrorist attack in Ingushetia when FSB agents destroyed their convoy; 12 militants were killed.

During the last years of the Vladimir Putin's second presidency (2006–2008), terrorist attacks in Russia dwindled, falling from 257 in 2005 to 48 in 2007. Military analyst Vitaly Shlykov praised the effectiveness of Russia's security agencies, saying that the experience learned in Chechnya and Dagestan had been key to the success. In 2008, the American Carnegie Endowment's Foreign Policy magazine named Russia as "the worst place to be a terrorist" and highlighted especially Russia's willingness to prioritize national security over civil rights. By 2010, Russian forces, led by the FSB, had managed to eliminate the top level leadership of the Chechen insurgency, except for Dokka Umarov.

Increased terrorism and expansion of the FSB's powers

Starting from 2009, the level of terrorism in Russia increased again, particularly suicide attacks. Between February 2005 and August 2008, no civilians were killed in such attacks. However, in 2008, at least 17 were killed, and in 2009 the number rose to 45.

In March 2010, Islamist militants organised the 2010 Moscow Metro bombings, which killed 40 people. One of the two blasts took place at Lubyanka station, near the FSB headquarters. Militant leader Doku Umarov—dubbed "Russia's Osama Bin Laden"—took responsibility for the attacks.

In July 2010, President Dmitry Medvedev expanded the FSB's powers in its fight against terrorism. FSB officers received the power to issue warnings to citizens on actions that could lead to committing crimes and arrest people for 15 days if they fail to comply with legitimate orders given by the officers. The bill was harshly criticized by human rights organizations.

Role in Ukraine
Since 2014, the FSB devoted substantial resources to preparing for a Russian takeover of Ukraine. Although Russia's SVR and GRU (foreign and military intelligence services) were also involved, FSB had a lead role on "intelligence and influence operations."

The FSB's Fifth Service, also referred to as the "Department for Operational Information" and "Operational Information and International Relations Service" is stated by the BBC and Radio Free Europe as counterintelligence in former territories of the Soviet Union, work formerly done by the KGB's Fifth Service. Its Ninth Directorate of the Fifth Service targets Ukraine.

According to a report of the Royal United Services Institute citing interviews officers and analysts of Security Service of Ukraine, the FSB Ukraine team greatly expanded July 2021, and by February 2022 it had "around 200 officers" although most teams consist of only 10–20. Before the 2022 invasion, intelligence agencies in Ukraine, Germany, the UK, and the US reported that the FSB planned to replace elected leaders of Ukraine with Ukrainians now living in Russia.

In 2014, according to a Russian military analyst, the FSB badly misled Putin with claims that Ukrainians would welcome a Russian invasion of Crimea to free them from "fascists." According to Radio Free Europe, in 2022, the FSB again promised easy victory if Russia invaded Ukraine.

With the start of the 2022 Russian invasion of Ukraine, Ukrainian counterintelligence has repeatedly asserted that the FSB suffered failures of operations security, including acts of insubordination and possible sabotage. In March 2022, Russia's encrypted communication system in Ukraine became useless after the Russian military destroyed cellphone towers; unencrypted phone calls from the FSB in Ukraine to superiors in Moscow discussing the death of Vitaly Gerasimov were tapped and released publicly. Ukrainian intelligence reported that FSB members were leaking intelligence to them, including the location of the Chechen commandos sent to assassinate Zelensky. In late March, Ukrainian intelligence posted online the names, addresses, phone numbers, and more of 620 people they identified as FSB agents. None of these reports have been confirmed by the FSB.

Media outlets of Ukraine, its allies in the West, and Russian dissidents report that Vladimir Putin has blamed setbacks in the military operations on the FSB and the Fifth Service. On 11 March 2022, investigative journalist Andrei Soldatov reported that Fifth Service head Sergey Beseda and his deputy, Anatoly Bolyukh were under house arrest due to Putin's discontent with intelligence failures regarding the invasion of Ukraine. A U.S. official interviewed by The Wall Street Journal described the arrest report as "credible".

On 11 April 2022, the Times of London, citing unnamed sources who had spoken to Bellingcat executive director Christo Grozev, reported that Beseda was transferred to Lefortovo Prison, the scene of mass executions during Stalin's purges. The same report claims that up over 100 FSB agents from the Fifth Service had been sacked. The Times of London also reports that "it is thought that" the Fifth Service is now headed by Beseda's former subordinate, Grigory Grishaev.

According to an article in the 11 April 2022 issue of The Washington Post:Several current and former officials described the Russian security service as rife with corruption, beset by bureaucratic bloat and ultimately out of touch. A Ukrainian intelligence official said the FSB had spent millions recruiting a network of pro-Russian collaborators who ultimately told Putin and his top advisers, among them the current FSB director, what they wanted to hear.

There have been a series of alleged leaked letters from FSB analysts, made public after the invasion began, which report the same kind of problem, for example, "You have to write the analysis in a way that makes Russia the victor ... otherwise you get questioned for not doing good work."

Function

Counterintelligence
In 2011, the FSB said it had exposed 199 foreign spies, including 41 professional spies and 158 agents employed by foreign intelligence services. The number has risen in recent years: in 2006 the FSB reportedly caught about 27 foreign intelligence officers and 89 foreign agents. Comparing the number of exposed spies historically, the then-FSB Director Nikolay Kovalyov said in 1996: "There has never been such a number of spies arrested by us since the time when German agents were sent in during the years of World War II." The 2011 figure is similar to what was reported in 1995–1996, when around 400 foreign intelligence agents were uncovered during the two-year period.

In a high-profile case of foreign espionage, the FSB said in February 2012 that an engineer working at the Plesetsk Cosmodrome, Russia's main space center for military launches, had been sentenced to 13 years in prison on charges of state treason. A court judged that the engineer had sold information about the testing of new Russian strategic missile systems to the American CIA.

A number of scientists have been accused of espionage and illegal technology exports by the FSB since it was established; instances include researcher Igor Sutyagin, physicist Valentin Danilov, physical chemist Oleg Korobeinichev, academician Oskar Kaibyshev, and physicist Yury Ryzhov. Ecologist and journalist Alexander Nikitin, who worked with the Bellona Foundation, was accused of espionage. He published material exposing hazards posed by the Russian Navy's nuclear fleet. He was acquitted in 1999 after spending several years in prison (his case was sent for re-investigation 13 times while he remained in prison). In August 2021, the FSB arrested plasma physics-expert Alexander Kuranov, chief designer of the Hypersonic Systems Research Center (NIPGS in Russian) in St. Petersburg. Kuranov is suspected of passing secret information to a foreigner about hypersonic technology; he oversaw concept design on the Ayaks/Ajax hypersonic aircraft and has run a Russia-US scientific symposium for several years.

Other instances of prosecution are the cases of investigative journalist and ecologist Grigory Pasko, Vladimir Petrenko, who described danger posed by military chemical warfare stockpiles, and Nikolay Shchur, chairman of the Snezhinskiy Ecological Fund.

Other arrested people include Viktor Orekhov, a former KGB officer who assisted Soviet dissidents, Vladimir Kazantsev, who disclosed illegal purchases of eavesdropping devices from foreign firms, and Vil Mirzayanov, who had written that Russia was working on a nerve-gas weapon.

Counter-terrorism

In 2011, the FSB prevented 94 "crimes of a terrorist nature", including eight terrorist attacks. In particular, the agency foiled a planned suicide bombing in Moscow on New Year's Eve. However, the agency failed to prevent terrorists perpetrating the Domodedovo International Airport bombing. Over the years, FSB and affiliated state security organizations have killed all presidents of the separatist Chechen Republic of Ichkeria including Dzhokhar Dudaev, Zelimkhan Yandarbiev, Aslan Maskhadov, and Abdul-Khalim Saidullaev. During the Moscow theater hostage crisis and Beslan school hostage crisis, all hostage-takers were killed on the spot by FSB spetsnaz forces. Only one of the suspects, Nur-Pashi Kulayev, survived and was convicted later by the court. It is reported that more than 100 leaders of terrorist groups have been killed during 119 operations on North Caucasus during 2006. On 28 July 2006, the FSB presented a list of 17 terrorist organizations recognized by the Supreme Court of the Russian Federation, to Rossiyskaya Gazeta newspaper, which published the list that day. The list had been available previously, but only through individual request. Commenting on the list, Yuri Sapunov, head of anti-terrorism at the FSB, named three main criteria necessary for organizations to be listed.

Foreign intelligence
According to some unofficial sources, since 1999, the FSB has also been tasked with the intelligence-gathering on the territory of the CIS countries, wherein the SVR is legally forbidden from conducting espionage under the inter-government agreements. Such activity is in line with Article 8 of the Federal Law on the FSB.

According to the Royal United Services Institute, FSB's Department for Operational Information "is responsible for compiling data on Russia's 'near abroad, having taken over the work of KGB's Fifth Service, which ran counterintelligence inside territories of the Soviet Union.

Targeted killing
In the summer of 2006, the FSB was given the legal power to engage in targeted killing of terrorism suspects overseas if so ordered by the president.

Border protection

The Federal Border Guard Service (FPS) has been part of the FSB since 2003. One kilometer (.62 miles) of border protection costs around 1 million rubles per year.

Export control
The FSB is engaged in the development of Russia's export control strategy and examines drafts of international agreements related to the transfer of dual-use and military commodities and technologies. Its primary role in the nonproliferation sphere is to collect information to prevent the illegal export of controlled nuclear technology and materials.

Surveillance
In September 2017, WikiLeaks released "Spy Files Russia", revealing how a company called Peter-Service helped state entities gather data on Russian mobile phone users as part of an online surveillance system called the System for Operative Investigative Activities (SORM) with close collaboration with the FSB. SORM-1 is for wiretapping phones. SORM-2 intercepts electronic correspondence and Internet traffic. Beginning in the summer of 2014, SORM-3 has been "on guard" and integrates all telecommunication services in real time.

Cyber Units 
In recent years, the FSB has expanded its mission to include foreign intelligence collection and offensive cyber operations. Cyber analysts have referred to FSB hackers as Berserk Bear, Energetic Bear, Gamaredon, TeamSpy, Dragonfly, Havex, Crouching Yeti, and Koala.

The FSB reportedly has two primary centers overseeing its information security and cyber operations. The first is the 16th Center, which houses most of the FSB’s signals intelligence capabilities. The FSB also includes the 18th Center for Information Security, which oversees domestic operations and security but conducts foreign operations as well. The U.S. government indicted 18th Center FSB officers in 2017 for breaching Yahoo and millions of email accounts. In 2021, Ukrainian intelligence released information and recordings of 18th Center FSB officers based in Crimea as part of the “Gamaredon” hacking group.

Media reporting indicates FSB units are capable of manufacturing their own advanced malware tools and have been documented manipulating exposed malware to mimic other hacking teams and conceal their activities. Reporting indicates the FSB oversees training and research institutes, which directly support the FSB’s cyber mission.

One FSB team reportedly focuses on penetrating infrastructure and energy sector targets. Most operations linked to this team appear to be reconnaissance or clandestine surveillance. The targeting of the energy sector has raised concern within the U.S. government. The Department of Homeland Security and the Federal Bureau of Investigation have documented the unit’s reconnaissance and noted the possibility of inserting malware to cause future damage in an attack. The U.S. government also has linked the unit to attempts to penetrate state and local government networks in 2020.

Media reporting has documented close connections between the FSB and criminal and civilian hackers, which the FSB reportedly uses to augment and staff its cyber units. DOJ has indicted multiple Russian hackers for a variety of criminal and state-sponsored cyber activities. Many of these indictments describe the close relationship between criminal hackers and the FSB.

Organization

Director
Since 2008, the director of the FSB has been General Alexander Bortnikov.

First Deputy Director
The current First Deputy Director of the FSB is Sergei Korolev. He was appointed by Russian President Vladimir Putin on 24 February 2021.

Head of scientific and technical service
As of 2022 Eduard Chernovoltsev was listed the Head of scientific and technical service of the FSB.

Regional structure

Below the nationwide level, the FSB has regional offices in all the federal subjects of Russia. It also has administrations in the armed forces and other military institutions. Sub-departments exist for areas such as aviation, special training centers, forensic expertise, military medicine, etc.

Structure of the Federal Office (incomplete):
Counterintelligence Service (Department) – chiefs: Oleg Syromolotov (since Aug 2000), Valery Pechyonkin (September 1997 – August 2000)
Directorate for the Counterintelligence Support of Strategic Facilities
Military Counterintelligence Directorate – chiefs: Alexander Bezverkhny (at least since 2002), Vladimir Petrishchev (since January 1996)
Service (Department) for Protection of the Constitutional System and the Fight against Terrorism – chiefs: Alexey Sedov (since March 2006), Alexander Bragin (2004 – March 2006), Alexander Zhdankov (2001–2004), German Ugryumov (2000–2001)
Directorate for Terrorism and Political Extremism Control – chiefs: Mikhail Belousov, before him Grafov, before the latter Boris Mylnikov (since 2000)
Economic Security Service (Department) – chiefs: Sergei Korolev (June 2016 to February 24, 2021),  (2008 to June 2016), Alexander Bortnikov (2 March 2004 to 2008), Yury Zaostrovtsev (January 2000 – March 2004), Viktor Ivanov (April 1999 – January 2000), Nikolay Patrushev (1998 – April 1999), Alexander Grigoryev (28 August – 1 October 1998).
Operational Information and International Relations Service (Analysis, Forecasting, and Strategic Planning Department) – chiefs: Sergey Beseda (since 2009), Viktor Komogorov (1999–2009), Sergei Ivanov (1998–1999); The successor of the KGB's Fifth Service, this department is in charge of counterintelligence operations against territories of the former Soviet Union.
Organizational and Personnel Service (Department) – chiefs: Yevgeny Lovyrev (since 2001), Yevgeny Solovyov (before Lovyrev)
Department for Activity Provision – chiefs: Mikhail Shekin (since September 2006), Sergey Shishin (before Shekin), Pyotr Pereverzev (as of 2004), Alexander Strelkov (before Pereverzev)
Border Guard Service – chiefs: Vladimir Pronichev (since 2003)
Control Service – chiefs: Alexander Zhdankov (since 2004)
Inspection Directorate – chiefs: Vladimir Anisimov (2004 – May 2005), Rashid Nurgaliyev (12 July 2000 – 2002),
Internal Security Directorate – chiefs: Alexander Kupryazhkin (until September 2006), Sergei Shishin (before Kupryazhkin since December 2002), Sergei Smirnov (April 1999 – December 2002), Viktor Ivanov (1998 – April 1999), Nikolay Patrushev (1994–1998)
Science and Engineering Service (Department) – chiefs: Nikolai Klimashin
Center of Information Security
Investigation Directorate – chiefs: Nikolay Oleshko (since December 2004), Yury Anisimov (as of 2004), Viktor Milchenko (since 2002), Sergey Balashov (until 2002 since at least 2001), Vladimir Galkin (as of 1997 and 1998)

Besides the services (departments) and directorates of the federal office, the territorial directorates of FSB in the federal subjects are also subordinate to it. Of these, St. Petersburg and Leningrad Oblast Directorate of FSB and its predecessors (historically covering both Leningrad/Saint Petersburg and Leningrad Oblast) have played especially important roles in the history of this organization, as many of the officers of the Directorate, including Vladimir Putin and Nikolay Patrushev, later assumed important positions within the federal FSB office or other government bodies. After the last Chief of the Soviet time, Anatoly Kurkov, the St. Petersburg and Leningrad Oblast Directorate were led by Sergei Stepashin (29 November 1991 – 1992), Viktor Cherkesov (1992 –1998), Alexander Grigoryev (1 October 1998 – 5 January 2001), Sergei Smirnov (5 January 2001 – June 2003), Alexander Bortnikov (June 2003 – March 2004) and Yury Ignashchenkov (since March 2004).

Directors of the FSB
On 20 June 1996, Boris Yeltsin fired Director of FSB Mikhail Barsukov and appointed Nikolay Kovalyov as acting Director and later Director of the FSB. Aleksander Bortnikov took over on 12 May 2008.

 Nikolai Golushko, December 1993 – February 1994
 Sergei Stepashin, February 1994 – June 1995
 Mikhail Barsukov, July 1995 – June 1996
 Nikolai Kovalyov, July 1996 – July 1998
 Vladimir Putin, July 1998 – August 1999
 Nikolai Patrushev, August 1999 – 12 May 2008
 Alexander Bortnikov, 12 May 2008 – present

Criticism
The FSB has been criticised for corruption, human rights violations and secret police activities. Some Kremlin critics such as Alexander Litvinenko have claimed that the FSB is engaged in suppression of internal dissent; Litvinenko died in 2006 as a result of polonium poisoning. Litvinenko, along with a series of other authors such as Yury Felshtinsky, David Satter, Boris Kagarlitsky, Vladimir Pribylovsky, Mikhail Trepashkin, have claimed that the 1999 apartment bombings in Moscow and other Russian cities were a false flag attack coordinated by the FSB in order to win public support for a new full-scale war in Chechnya and boost former FSB director and then prime minister Vladimir Putin's popularity in the lead-up to parliamentary elections and presidential transfer of power. The FSB has been further criticised by some for failure to bring Islamist terrorism in Russia under control. In the mid-2000s, the pro-Kremlin Russian sociologist Olga Kryshtanovskaya claimed that the FSB played a dominant role in the country's political, economic and even cultural life.

After the annexation of Crimea, the FSB may also have been responsible for the forced disappearances and torture of Crimean Tatar activists and public figures. According to the United Nations, in occupied Crimea, the FSB used torture with elements of sexual violence against pro-Ukrainian activists, forcing them to confess to crimes related to terrorism. The detainees were beaten, tortured with electric shocks in the genitals and threatened with rape. Some, such as Oleh Sentsov, have been detained and accused in politically motivated kangaroo courts. The FSB spied on and filmed a gathering of members of the Jehovah's Witnesses while they were about to undergo baptism rites, with the videos used as evidence in a trial against the defendants in 2021; Jehovah's Witnesses have been banned as a group in Russia since 2017 for "extremism".

In spite of various anti-corruption actions of the government FSB operatives and officials are routinely found in the center of various fraud, racket and corruption scandals. FSB officers have been frequently accused of torture, extortion, bribery and illegal takeovers of private companies, often working together with tax inspection officers. Active and former FSB officers are also present as "curators" in "almost every single large enterprise", both in public and private sectors. Several unnamed current and former officials described the FSB as less effective than the KGB, describing it as "rife with corruption, beset by bureaucratic bloat and ultimately out of touch", in a report by the Washington Post in 2022.

On 29 December 2016, the White House accused and sanctioned the FSB and several other Russian companies for what the US intelligence agencies said was their role in helping the Russian military intelligence service, the Main Intelligence Directorate (GRU) disrupt and spread disinformation during the 2016 US presidential election. In addition, the State Department also declared 35 Russian diplomats and officials persona non-grata and denied Russian government officials access to two Russian-owned installations in Maryland and New York.

An investigation by Bellingcat and The Insider'' implicated FSB agents in the poisoning of opposition leader Alexei Navalny in August 2020, where he became ill during a flight.

It was reported that during the 2022 Russian invasion of Ukraine, FSB officers carried out filtration activities in Mariupol, which were accompanied by searches, interrogations, forced deportations to Russia, beatings and torture.

Role in the Russian doping scandal

Following the broadcast of a documentary film alleging systematic doping in Russia, World Anti-Doping Agency (WADA) president Craig Reedie authorized an Independent Commission (IC) to investigate the issues brought up by the documentary in 2015. The IC authorized a review of practices on whether there were any breaches by the Russian Anti-Doping Agency. The report found direct interference into the laboratory’s operations by the Russian State undermined the laboratory’s independence and that tests conducted by the laboratory were highly suspect. The report elaborates on the role of the FSB:

In January 2016, the head of Russia's anti-doping laboratory Grigory Rodchenkov fled Russia and exposed the doping program, which included members of the FSB replacing tainted urine samples with older, clean ones. As a result of the scandals the International Association of Athletics Federations suspended Russia from all international athletic competitions including the 2016 Summer Olympics.

In July 2016, the first McLaren Report found that "beyond a reasonable doubt" the Russian Ministry of Sport, the Centre of Sports Preparation of the National Teams of Russia, the FSB, and the WADA-accredited laboratory in Moscow "operated for the protection of doped Russian athletes" within a "state-directed failsafe system" using "the disappearing positive [test] methodology." In a second McLaren Report released December 2016, it was found that In the period before the Sochi Games, a “clean urine bank” was established at the FSB Command Centre, which was situated immediately adjacent to the Sochi Laboratory. Inside that building a dedicated room containing several large freezers was set up for the purpose of storing the clean urine samples.

See also

Awards of the Federal Security Service of the Russian Federation
Federal Protective Service, government protection agency
SORM, law that allows the FSB to monitor communications
Third Section of His Imperial Majesty's Own Chancellery

References

External links

 

1995 establishments in Russia
 
Government agencies established in 1995
Government of Russia
Doping in Russia
Russian entities subject to the U.S. Department of the Treasury sanctions
Specially Designated Nationals and Blocked Persons List